The following is a list of notable performers of rock and roll music or rock music, and others directly associated with the music as producers, songwriters or in other closely related roles, who have died. The list gives their date, cause and location of death, and their age.

Rock music developed from the rock and roll music that emerged during the 1950s, and includes a diverse range of subgenres. The terms "rock and roll" and "rock" each have a variety of definitions, some narrow and some wider. In determining criteria for inclusion, this list uses as its basis reliable sources listing "rock deaths" or "deaths in rock and roll", as well as such sources as the Rock and Roll Hall of Fame.

1950s

1960s

1970s

1980s

1990s

2000s

2010s

2020s

See also

 27 Club
 List of pop musicians who died of drug overdose
 List of murdered musicians
 List of murdered hip hop musicians

External links
 The Dead Rock Stars Club
 Youngest Rock Star Deaths

Deaths
rock and roll